Hainzenberg is a municipality in the Schwaz district in the Austrian state of Tyrol.

Geography
Hainzenberg lies southeast of Zell am Ziller at the entrance to the Gerlos valley.

References

Cities and towns in Schwaz District